TNP or Tnp may refer to:

 Triglav National Park, Julian Alps, Slovenia
 2,4,6-trinitrophenol, better known as picric acid
 The Twentynine Palms Airport, California, US
 The Théâtre National Populaire, Villeurbanne, France
 These New Puritans a UK rock band
 Transposase, an enzyme
 The National Party, a political party in Grenada